MNSI, MnSi or MNSi may refer to
MNSi Telecom, a Canadian Internet service provider
Manganese monosilicide, a material with the chemical formula MnSi
Brownleeite, a mineral with the chemical formula MnSi
 Siuna Airport in Nicaragua (ICAO code MNSI)